Gateway of India is an arch-monument in Mumbai, India.

Gateway of India may also refer to:
 Gateway of India (film), a 1957 Hindi-language film
 Gateway of India Dialogue, geo-economic conference held in Mumbai, India

See also 
 India Gate, war memorial in New Delhi, India